Miguel Pedro Martínez Lopes, also commonly known as Miguel Pedro (born 6 July 1912, date of death unknown), was a Brazilian basketball player. He competed in the men's tournament at the 1936 Summer Olympics.

References

External links
 

1912 births
Year of death missing
Brazilian men's basketball players
Olympic basketball players of Brazil
Basketball players at the 1936 Summer Olympics
Basketball players from Rio de Janeiro (city)